Laurence Junior Burton (October 30, 1926 – November 27, 2002) was a U.S. Representative from Utah.

Born in Ogden, Utah, Burton graduated from Ogden High School in 1944.
Enlisted in the United States Navy Air Corps and served from January 1945 to July 1946.
He graduated from Weber College at Ogden, in 1948, from the University of Utah in 1951, and from Utah State University at Logan in 1956.
Took postgraduate work at Georgetown and George Washington University, Washington, D.C., in 1957 and 1958.
Public relations director and athletic manager at Weber College from 1948 to 1956.
Regional director for American College Public Relations Association in 1954 and 1955.
He was editor of National Junior College Athletic Association magazine from 1951 to 1961.
Legislative assistant to U.S. Representative Henry Aldous Dixon in 1957 and 1958.
He served as assistant professor of political science at Weber College from 1958 to 1960.
Administrative assistant to Utah Governor George Dewey Clyde from 1960 to 1962.
He served as delegate, Republican National Convention, 1968.

Burton was elected as a Republican to the Eighty-eighth and to the three succeeding Congresses (January 3, 1963 – January 3, 1971).
He was not a candidate for reelection in 1970, but was an unsuccessful nominee in 1970 to the United States Senate.
He died aged 76 on November 27, 2002, in Ogden.

Burton was a member of the Church of Jesus Christ of Latter-day Saints.

Sources

 Political Graveyard

1926 births
2002 deaths
20th-century American politicians
George Washington University alumni
Georgetown University alumni
Latter Day Saints from Utah
Military personnel from Utah
People from Ogden, Utah
Republican Party members of the United States House of Representatives from Utah
United States congressional aides
United States Naval Aviators
University of Utah alumni
Utah State University alumni
Weber State University alumni
Weber State University faculty